María Florencia "Flor" Bonsegundo (born 14 July 1993), known as Florencia Bonsegundo, is an Argentine professional footballer who plays as a midfielder for Spanish Liga F club Madrid CFF and the Argentina women's national team.

Club career
Bonsegundo played in the Spanish Primera División for Sporting de Huelva between 2018 and 2019.

International career
Bonsegundo represented Argentina at the 2012 FIFA U-20 Women's World Cup. At senior level, she played two Copa América Femenina editions (2014 and 2018), scoring two goals in the first and three in the latter, and the 2015 Pan American Games.
At 2019 Women's World Cup, she scored the final goal of a 3–3 tie with Scotland.

International goals
Scores and results list Argentina's goal tally first

References
Notes

Citations

External links
Profile at La Liga

1993 births
Living people
Women's association football midfielders
Argentine women's footballers
Sportspeople from Córdoba Province, Argentina
Argentina women's international footballers
2019 FIFA Women's World Cup players
Pan American Games competitors for Argentina
Footballers at the 2015 Pan American Games
South American Games gold medalists for Argentina
South American Games medalists in football
Competitors at the 2014 South American Games
Huracán (women) players
UAI Urquiza (women) players
Primera División (women) players
Sporting de Huelva players
Argentine expatriate women's footballers
Argentine expatriate sportspeople in Spain
Expatriate women's footballers in Spain